Streptomyces bangladeshensis is a thermophilic bacterium species from the genus of Streptomyces which has been isolated from soil in Natore in Bangladesh. Streptomyces bangladeshensis produces bis(2-ethylhexyl) phthalate.

See also 
 List of Streptomyces species

References

Further reading

External links
Type strain of Streptomyces bangladeshensis at BacDive -  the Bacterial Diversity Metadatabase

bangladeshensis
Bacteria described in 2005